The Players Amateur was an annual amateur golf tournament. It was played from 2000 to 2019. It was organized by the Heritage Classic Foundation, which also sponsored the RBC Heritage on the PGA Tour. It was last played at Berkeley Hall Club in Bluffton, South Carolina.

Winners
2019 Spencer Ralston
2018 John Augenstein
2017 Philip Knowles
2016 Jin Cheng
2015 Matthew NeSmith
2014 Scott Vincent
2013 Hunter Stewart
2012 Daniel Nisbet
2011 Corbin Mills
2010 Kevin Tway
2009 Bud Cauley
2008 Mark Anderson
2007 Rickie Fowler
2006 Jonathan Moore
2005 Brian Harman
2004 Aron Price
2003 Camilo Villegas
2002 Bill Haas
2001 Michael Sims
2000 Ben Curtis

References

External links
Official site
List of winners

Amateur golf tournaments in the United States
Golf in South Carolina